North Zone or Northern Zone may refer to:

North Zone of Afghanistan
North Zone cricket team, an Indian first-class cricket team
North Zone cricket team (Bangladesh)
North Zone Cultural Centre in Patiala, Punjab, India
Northern Indo-Aryan languages
Northern Railway zone of Indian Railways
Zona Norte (LMB), of the Mexican Baseball League
Zona Norte, Tijuana, Mexico
Zone occupée, the occupied zone of France during the Second World War